Odile de Roubin (born 28 September 1948) is a former professional tennis player from France.

Biography
As a junior, de Roubin won the girls' singles title at the 1966 French Championships.

During the 1970s she competed on the professional tour, making regular appearances at the French Open and Wimbledon Championships. Her best performance came at the 1973 French Open, where she won her way through to the quarter-finals, beating third seed Virginia Wade en route. She also toppled the third seed at the 1975 French Open, American player Julie Heldman.

She represented France in three editions of the Federation Cup, in 1970, 1973 and 1974, for a total of 11 ties.

See also
List of France Fed Cup team representatives

References

External links
 
 

1948 births
Living people
French female tennis players
Universiade medalists in tennis
French Championships junior (tennis) champions
Universiade bronze medalists for France
Grand Slam (tennis) champions in girls' singles
Medalists at the 1970 Summer Universiade